The 87th Regiment Illinois Volunteer Infantry, later the 87th Regiment Illinois Volunteer Mounted Infantry, was an infantry regiment that served in the Union Army during the American Civil War.

Service
The 87th Illinois Infantry was organized at Shawneetown, Illinois and mustered into Federal service on October 3, 1862.  It was mounted in November, 1863.

The regiment was mustered out on June 16, 1865.

Total strength and casualties
The regiment suffered 1 officer and 15 enlisted men who were killed in action or who died of their wounds and 3 officers and 219 enlisted men who died of disease, for a total of 238 fatalities.

Commanders
Colonel John E. Whiting - resigned October 8, 1863
Lieutenant Colonel John M. Crebs - Mustered out with the regiment.

See also
List of Illinois Civil War Units
Illinois in the American Civil War

Notes

References
The Civil War Archive

Units and formations of the Union Army from Illinois
1862 establishments in Illinois
Military units and formations established in 1862
Military units and formations disestablished in 1865